Aedini is a mosquito tribe in the subfamily Culicinae. It is the main tribe of mosquitoes with 1256 species classified in 81 genera and two groups incertae sedis.

Genera 
Genus Abraedes
Genus Aedes
Genus Alanstonea
Genus Albuginosus
Genus Armigeres
Subgenus Armigeres
Subgenus Leicesteria
Genus Ayurakitia
Genus Aztecaedes
Genus Belkinius
Genus Borichinda
Genus Bothaella
Genus Bruceharrisonius
Genus Christophersiomyia
Genus Collessius
Subgenus Alloeomyia
Subgenus Collessius
Genus Dahliana
Genus Danielsia
Genus Diceromyia
Genus Dobrotworskyius
Genus Downsiomyia
Genus Edwardsaedes
Genus Eretmapodites
Genus Finlaya
Genus Fredwardsius
Genus Georgecraigius
Subgenus Georgecraigius
Subgenus Horsfallius
Genus Gilesius
Genus Gymnometopa
Genus Haemagogus
Subgenus Conopostegus
Subgenus Haemagogus
Genus Halaedes
Genus Heizmannia
Subgenus Heizmannia
Subgenus Mattinglyia
Genus Himalaius
Genus Hopkinsius
Subgenus Hopkinsius
Subgenus Yamada
Genus Howardina
Genus Huaedes
Genus Hulecoeteomyia
Genus Indusius
Genus Isoaedes
Genus Jarnellius
Subgenus Jarnellius
Subgenus Lewnielsenius
Genus Jihlienius
Genus Kenknightia
Genus Kompia
Genus Leptosomatomyia
Genus Lorrainea
Genus Luius
Genus Macleaya
Subgenus Chaetocruiomyia
Subgenus Macleaya
Genus Molpemyia
Genus Mucidus
Subgenus Mucidus
Subgenus Lewnielsenius
Genus Neomelaniconion
Genus Ochlerotatus
Subgenus Acartomyia
Subgenus Buvirilia
Subgenus Chrysoconops
Subgenus Culicelsa
Subgenus Empihals
Subgenus Geoskusea
Subgenus Gilesia
Subgenus Levua
Subgenus Ochlerotatus
Subgenus Pholeomyia
Subgenus Protoculex
Subgenus Pseudoskusea
Subgenus Rhinoskusea
Subgenus Rusticoidus
Subgenus Sallumia
Genus Opifex
Subgenus Nothoskusea
Subgenus Opifex
Genus Paraedes
Genus Patmarksia
Genus Phagomyia
Genus Pseudarmigeres
Genus Psorophora
Subgenus Grabhamia
Subgenus Janthinosoma
Subgenus Psorophora
Genus Rampamyia
Genus Scutomyia
Genus Skusea
Genus Stegomyia
Genus Tanakaius
Genus Tewarius
Genus Udaya
Genus Vansomerenis
Genus Verrallina
Subgenus Harbachius
Subgenus Neomacleaya
Subgenus Verrallina
Genus Zavortinkius
Genus Zeugnomyia

See also 
 List of mosquito genera

References 

 Huang, Y-M. & Rueda, L.M. 2015. A pictorial key to the species of the Aedes (Zavortinkius) in the Afrotropical Region (Diptera: Culicidae). Zootaxa 4027 (4): 593–599. 
 Reinert, J.F.; Harbach, R.E.; Kitching, I.J. 2009: Phylogeny and classification of tribe Aedini (Diptera: Culicidae). Zoological journal of the Linnean Society, 157(4): 700-794.

External links 
 

 Aedini at the Mosquito Taxonomic Inventory (retrieved 26 March 2016)

 
Nematocera tribes
Taxa named by Maurice Neveu-Lemaire